Manuel Frigo (born 18 February 1997) is an Italian swimmer. He won silver in the men's 4 × 100 metre freestyle relay at the 2020 Summer Olympics.

References

External links
 

1997 births
Living people
Italian male swimmers
Italian male freestyle swimmers
Olympic swimmers of Italy
Swimmers at the 2020 Summer Olympics
Medalists at the 2020 Summer Olympics
Olympic silver medalists for Italy
People from Cittadella
Olympic silver medalists in swimming
Medalists at the FINA World Swimming Championships (25 m)
Sportspeople from the Province of Padua
World Aquatics Championships medalists in swimming
European Aquatics Championships medalists in swimming
21st-century Italian people